is a song recorded by Japanese recording artist Minmi, taken from her seventh studio album Ego (2015). It was made available for digital download and physical consumption on June 10, 2015 through Universal J—a subsidiary label owned by Universal Music Japan—as her third stand-alone single. "Hologram" marks Minmi's second consecutive recording after "Ite Itai yo" to have been written, composed, arranged, and produced by herself. Musically, the song was described by a critic at Selective Hearing as a transition from her signature reggae music styles to electronic dance music, whilst retaining musical elements of dancehall music.

Upon its release, the single received generally positive reviews from music critics. Some pointed out the track as a highlight from the album, whilst acclaiming the song's composition. Minor criticism was outspoken towards the application of Auto-Tune to her vocals. Commercially, it under-performed in Japan, stalling at number 116 for a sole week on the Oricon Singles Chart, marking her lowest-selling release in that region. To promote the single, it was used for Japanese anime television series Jitsu wa Watashi wa (2015). Additionally, she appeared on Japanese music television shows Count Down TV and Refreshing!, with her as well performing the track at the 2016 Freedom Aozora concert venue.

Background, composition and release
In June 2016, it was confirmed through Anime News Network that Minmi would release a new song titled "Hologram", which would serve as a featured track for the first season of Japanese anime television series, Actually, I Am… (Japanese: Jitsu wa Watashi wa) (2015). "Hologram" marks Minmi's second consecutive single to have been written, composed, arranged, and produced by herself, following her 2014 single "Ite Itai yo". Musically, it was pointed out by a writer for Selective Hearing as a transition from her signature reggae music styles from previous releases to dance-pop and electronic dance music, whilst retaining musical elements of dancehall music. It also incorporates synthesizers and keyboards in its instrumentation, with Minmi's vocals being processed with Auto-Tune and vocoder pyrotechnics.

"Hologram" was released as the singer's third stand-alone digital single on June 10, 2015 through Universal J, a subsidiary label owned by Universal Music Japan; its artwork featured blue, purple, pink and green confetti. The label distributed the recording for physical consumption as a DVD and CD in Japan, with a digital EP being made available in several other territories. All formats included the original mix of the single, with the addition of B-side track "#Yaccahaina" in collaboration with Japanese performer Mary Jane. The DVD release incorporated Minmi performing "Hologram" live at the 2014 Freedom Aozora concert venue. The accompanying cover sleeve for all three formats portrayed a pink-haired Minmi surrounded by digitally-superimposed confetti.

Reception
Upon its release, the single received positive reviews from music critics. AllMusic's Adam Greenberg, who contributed to Mimni's biography on the website, cited the track as one of her best works. In a similar review, CD Journal staff members pointed out "Hologram" as a highlight from her album Ego. Another critic from the same publication commended Minmi's transition to electronic dance music, labeling the recording's production as "bold" and "spacey". The review further acclaimed the singer's vocals and songwriting on the single. An editor from Selective Hearing enjoyed the track, concluding that, "In the end this is a slight deviation from Minmi's typical releases, but it's also refreshing to hear her branch a little bit." However, the publication negatively perceived the overuse of Auto-tune in the track and felt the corresponding B-side songs were better than the single. Commercially, "Hologram" under-performed in Japan. It debuted at number 116 for a sole week on the Oricon Singles Chart, marking Minmi's lowest-charting release since "La La La (Ai no Uta)" (2012), which peaked at number 58. As of July 2016, it is her lowest-selling single according to Oricon Style's database.

Music video and promotion
An accompanying music video for "Hologram" was directed by Hideharu Ueki. It opens with a woman walking down a beach front, with her subsequently holding and letting go of her bikini strap by the pre-chorus. Over the rest of the visual, she is portrayed being engaged alone or with a man in the water or playing around the beach shore; several of the scenes repeat throughout the music video. The clip appeared on the DVD version of its parent album, Ego. To promote the single, it was used for Japanese anime television series Jitsu wa Watashi wa (2015). She also appeared on the Japanese television music shows Count Down TV and Refreshing! to perform the song, alongside providing an interview in each show. Minmi subsequently performed "Hologram" live at the 2016 Freedom Aozona concert venue; various other Japanese acts, such as Scandal and 10-Feet, were present at the venue.

Credits and personnel
Credits adapted from the CD liner notes of "Hologram".

Management
Management done by record label Universal J.

Credits
Minmi – lead vocals, producing, composing, songwriting, mixing, arranging
Mary Jane – featured artist, backing vocals
Hideharu Ueki – music video director

Track list and formats
All lyrics written by Minmi.

Charts

Release history

References

External links
"Hologram" at Minmi's official website. 
"Hologram" profile at Oricon Style. 

2015 singles
2015 songs
Anime songs
Japanese-language songs